Berti is both an Italian surname and a given name. It is also the German familiar form of Berthold.

Notable people with the name include:

Surname:
 Adam Berti (born 1986), Canadian ice hockey player
 Alfredo Berti (born 1971), Argentine football player and manager
 Antonio Berti (painter) (1830–1912), Italian painter
 Antonio Berti (sculptor) (1904–1990), Italian sculptor and medalist
 Antonio Berti (senator) (1812–1879), Italian politician and senator
 Beatrice Berti (born 1996), Italian volleyball player
 Dehl Berti (1921–1991), Native American actor
 Eduardo Berti (born 1964), Argentine writer
 Elisa De Berti (born 1974), Italian politician
 Enrico Berti (1935–2022), Italian philosopher
 Gasparo Berti (c. 1600–1643), Italian physicist and astronomer
 Gianluca Berti (born 1967), Italian football goalkeeper
 Gian Marco Berti (born 1982), Sammarinese sports shooter
 Giorgio Berti (1794–1863), Italian painter
 Giovanni Lorenzo Berti (1696–1766), Italian theologian
 Giovanni Pietro Berti (c. 1590–1638), Italian composer and organist 
 Gláuber (footballer, born 1983), the nickname of Gláuber Berti (born 1983), Brazilian footballer
 Humberto Calderón Berti (born 1941), Venezuelan geologist, petroleum engineer, diplomat, politician and author
 Joel Berti (born 1971), American actor
 Jon Berti (born 1990), American baseball player
 László Berti (1875–1952), Hungarian fencer
 Maria Luisa Berti (born 1971), Sammarinese politician
 Marina Berti (1924–2002), Italian film actress
 Mario Berti (1881–1960), Italian general during the Spanish Civil War and World War II
 Nicola Berti (born 1967), Italian football player
 Orietta Berti (born 1945), Italian pop-folk singer
 Pietro Berti (1741-1813), Italian jesuit and professor of rhetoric.
 Ruggero Berti (1909–1985), American cyclist 
 Sergio Berti (born 1969), Argentine football player
 Silvia Berti, history professor at the University of Rome La Sapienza
 Simone Berti, Italian  basketball player
 Tommaso Berti (born 2004), Italian professional footballer
 Tony Berti (born 1972), American football player
 Yvette Lambin-Berti, Monegasque sports administrator and diplomat 

Given name:
 Berti Vogts (born 1945), German football player and manager

Other
 Berti Finno, settlement in Kenya's Mandera County
 Berti Hills or Tagabo Hills, volcanic field in the region of Darfur in Sudan

See also
 Bertie (disambiguation)
 Berty (disambiguation)

Italian-language surnames